Alexander Read may refer to:
 Alexander Read (surgeon) (1786–1870), president of the Royal College of Surgeons in Ireland
 Alex Read (born 1991), Australian soccer player

See also
 Alex Reid (disambiguation)
 Alex Reed (disambiguation)